Taşdeğirmen is a village in the Çıldır District, Ardahan Province, Turkey. Its population is 299 (2021).

Local values and traditions of the village are dominated Caucasus culture and life style, as in the last century the ties are very strong.

The food in the village: Goose dinner, Fesell of Kete contain oil in the frying pastries; Bishi, Mafiş, delight, Cream made by mixing and nezik kuymak. Dumplings, noodles, rice and cereals as well made using a variety of pastas, soups are contained in the modern kitchen and dining is done every round. Of course, any kind of meat by reason of a village life, milk and dairy products are produced and consumed. At the beginning of these yogurt, cheese is the most important.

The village has a primary school. (Student's transportation system was introduced is less, students are trained in love with the village festival) it has a network of drinking water in the village but there is no sewerage system. There is a post office and a post office branch. There are health centers. Asphalt roads connecting villages, transport, electricity, fixed telephone and internet.

References

Villages in Çıldır District